Hubert Seed Wilkinson (7 June 1897 – 5 May 1984) was an Anglican priest in the 20th Century.

He served in the Royal Artillery from 1916 to 1919 when he entered Durham University. After a curacy in Colne he held incumbencies in Harpurhey, Chester-le-Street, Allerton, Winster, Ambleside and Grassendale. He was Archdeacon of Westmorland from 1947 to 1951; and Archdeacon of Liverpool from 1951 to 1970.

Notes

1897 births
Archdeacons of Westmorland
Archdeacons of Liverpool
1984 deaths
Alumni of St John's College, Durham
British Army personnel of World War I
Royal Artillery personnel